The South Africa men's national indoor hockey team represents South Africa at international indoor hockey matches and tournaments.

The team's nickname, "BlitzStoks", is derived from "blitz" an Afrikaans word meaning lightning, and the "sticks" of the South African hockey team.

Tournament history

Indoor Africa Cup 
 2017 – 
 2021 –

Indoor Hockey World Cup 
 2003  – 10th place
2007 – 11th place
2015 – 11th place
2018 – 11th place
2023 – 6th place

Current squad
Squad for the 2023 Men's FIH Indoor Hockey World Cup.

Head coach: Justin Rosenberg

See also
South Africa women's national indoor hockey team
South Africa men's national field hockey team

References

External links
 Official

indoor hockey
South Africa